Steve Lynch (born January 18, 1955) is an American guitarist, best known as the co-founder and original lead guitarist for the glam metal/hard rock band Autograph. He decided to commit himself to music and mastering guitar when Jimi Hendrix died in 1970. In addition to Hendrix, Lynch's musical influences came from late-1960s and early-1970s English rock musicians such as Led Zeppelin, Pink Floyd and the Beatles. He initially played bass, however Hendrix's death influenced him to switch to guitar.

Lynch gradually developed his signature two-handed (eight-finger) tapping technique throughout the 1970s and into the mid-1980s.

Career 
Lynch rose to national acclaim in the mid-1980s, when his then-current band, Autograph, had a top-40 hit with "Turn Up the Radio", which reached  29 on the US Billboard Hot 100. Lynch's work on this track helped earn him "Guitar Solo of the Year" honors from Guitar Magazine. As of 2022 he along with lead vocalist and rhythm guitarist Steve Plunkett are the only two surviving members of the original lineup.

After recording and touring with Autograph, he taught his two-handed guitar technique in 20 countries completing 325 clinics to promote his books 'The Right Touch' volumes 1, 2 & 3 while promoting St. Louis Music simultaneously.

In 1994, he formed his solo project Network 23 with Scott Gilman on vocals and sax, and Chris Frazier and Mike Mangini on drums. Lynch wrote, arranged, produced and played all the guitar, bass, keyboards and additional percussion parts. The recording was completed in 1995. Taking a more experimental approach with his writing and arranging, he considered the project to be more of a modern sound than the 80s genre and Autograph.

In 2006, Lynch founded 'The Federal Way School of Music' in Seattle, Washington where he taught and ran the school until 2016.

While managing his school he also reformed Autograph with a new vocalist and drummer in 2013. The band released an album in 2015 which garnished two singles: 'Get Off Your Ass' and 'Every Generation', which generated new audience recognition in the US, Scandinavia, Europe and Japan. After the release of the album and touring with the band for 5 1/2 years, Lynch left the group in August 2019 to pursue a new musical direction, which he described as being influenced by international cultures and experiences. He's calling the new project Blue Neptune.

When the COVID pandemic hit, Lynch decided to write his autobiography 'Confessions of a Rock Guitarist', which has been completed and is currently being prepared for release in 2022.

Steve currently resides in Florida and New Jersey.

Technique 
Lynch is generally considered a highly skilled and innovative guitarist. His multi-fingered tapping technique, which he still teaches today, incorporates a complex approach to music theory and often requires the use of all four picking-hand fingers as well as those on the fretting hand. This approach means that Lynch's solos are often highly technically challenging. Perhaps the most elaborate recorded example of the technique is the unaccompanied instrumental track "Hammerhead", from Autograph's second album That's the Stuff. In 1985, Lynch won the "Guitar Solo of the Year" award from Guitar Player magazine for his solo on "Turn Up The Radio", Autograph's biggest hit.

References

External links 
Official website

1955 births
American heavy metal guitarists
Lead guitarists
Living people
Musicians from Seattle
Guitarists from Washington (state)
Savoy Brown members
20th-century American guitarists